Kaleideum in Winston-Salem, North Carolina was created from the July 2016 merger of Children's Museum of Winston-Salem and SciWorks, the Science Center and Environmental Park of Forsyth County. Currently, the museum operates two locations — Kaleideum Downtown (formerly The Children's Museum of Winston-Salem) and Kaleideum North (formerly SciWorks).

History

Kaleideum North

Kaleideum North began in 1964 as the Nature Science Center, started by the local Junior League; the museum was originally housed in a barn at Reynolda Village. In 1972, the Nature Science Center moved to its present location on Hanes Mill Road, into a campus that originally housed the Forsyth County Home and Hospital, the precursor to Forsyth Medical Center. In 1992, the Nature Science Center closed and underwent a major renovation, re-opening under the name SciWorks. In 2001, the museum upgraded the facilities by doubling the space of one of the main galleries and adding an indoor eating area to the building.

The exhibit galleries cover a wide range of topics such as North Carolina geography and geology, the human body, physics (featuring a Foucault pendulum), sound, and technology. In addition, there is a traveling exhibit gallery that features both nationally touring exhibits and exhibits created in-house. The BioWorks exhibit, focusing on animals both local and exotic, was renovated in 2010.

The environmental park features white-tailed deer and a barnyard that has donkeys, sheep, and cows. The museum runs several interactive education programs for elementary and middle school students. In addition, Kaleideum North also offers special summer camps, as well as camp-ins for Boy Scouts and Girl Scouts.

Kaleideum Downtown 
Kaleideum Downtown, formerly The Children's Museum of Winston-Salem, is located at 390 South Liberty Street in Winston-Salem. The museum was created by the Junior League of Winston-Salem as a gift to the city to celebrate the league's 75th anniversary. The museum opened its doors during November 2004 as a safe place for young children and their families to learn and play together. Designed with a literature-based theme, the museum focused on experiential learning and the educational benefits of play through literature, storytelling, and the arts, while offering birthday parties, summer camps, field trips, workshops, storytime programming, theatre performances, and special community events. The Junior League pledged that 10 percent of its active members would volunteer at the museum until at least 2020.

In November 2014, the Children's Museum acquired Peppercorn Theatre, which was founded in 2010 by John Bowhers and Anna Rooney. Peppercorn became a programming arm of the museum and produces high quality, original theatre works and puppet shows to entertain and educate.

Merger between Children's Museum and SciWorks
A merger between the Children's Museum of Winston-Salem and SciWorks was first discussed in 2015. In July 2016 they officially merged, and Forsyth County commissioners approved $17 million for a new museum building where the sheriff's office used to be. On February 7, 2017, the name Kaleideum, combining kaleidoscope and museum, was announced for the museum.

Kaleideum announced on July 6, 2017, that Stitch Design Shop and Gensler would be the architectural firms designing its new building.

On June 24, 2021, Forsyth County commissioners approved spending as much as $27.2 million on the new building, expected to open in 2023. The total expected cost is $28.6 million, with $9 million pledged to finance exhibits.

Permanent exhibits 
Kaleideum Downtown features many permanent and rotating exhibits. The permanent exhibits include: "Kaleidoscape", a crocheted climbing structure by fiber artist Toshiko MacAdam; two multi-level climbing structures by playground designer Tom Luckey; "The Enchanted Forest", an imaginative play area with a folklore theme; "The Amazing Library", a library for young readers; "Food Lion Supermarket", a child-sized supermarket area with plush food; "Amazing Airways", a series of air tubes that are designed to allow children to test hypotheses about air flow; " The Prop Shop", a recreated theater backstage that provides craft materials and suggested art activities; and "Krispy Kreme Doughnut Factory", a recreated doughnut assembly line and delivery truck.

Kaleideum North features a planetarium; PhysicsWorks, an exploration of physics through simple machines and demonstrations; BioWorks, the museum's collection of small live animals including a Blue-and-yellow macaw; HealthWorks, the museum's human biology exhibit; KevaWorks, a KEVA Planks build area; Mountains to Sea, a natural history exhibit complete with animal, plant, and geological specimens; nature trails; and barnyard and garden learning areas.

References

External links 
 

Charities based in North Carolina
Children's museums in North Carolina
Museums in Winston-Salem, North Carolina
Science museums in North Carolina
Planetaria in the United States
Zoos in North Carolina
Natural history museums in North Carolina
Protected areas of Forsyth County, North Carolina
Nature centers in North Carolina